The following is a list of awards and nominations received by Daniel Day-Lewis throughout his career. His major acting awards include three Academy Award wins and six nominations, four BAFTA Award wins and six nominations, other significant awards include three Critics' Choice Movie Award wins and six nominations, two Golden Globe Award wins and eight nominations, three Screen Actors Guild Award wins and five nominations and three Satellite Award wins and four nominations. His most award-winning performance is There Will Be Blood with 43 award wins out of a total of 50 nominations from varying critic circles. Overall in his career he has won 139 acting awards receiving 212 nominations.

Major associations

Academy Awards

British Academy Film Awards

Golden Globe Awards

Screen Actors Guild Awards

Other awards and nominations

Critics' Choice Movie Awards

Los Angeles Film Critics Association

National Society of Film Critics

New York Film Critics Circle

Satellite Awards

Toronto Film Critics Association

Vancouver Film Critics Circle

Records and achievements

Notes

References

Day-Lewis, Daniel